Greenwich Village High School (GVHS) is a planned grade 9-12 independent high school in Manhattan, New York City. The school is located at 30 Vandam Street between 6th Avenue and Varick. GVHS was scheduled to open in September 2009.

On the Greenwich Village High School website, it says that the school, "will be the first independent, co-ed, nondenominational school exclusively for students in grades nine through twelve in New York City".  It is the intention of the board to create a private, nonreligious high school.

Utilizing the resources of the larger NYC community, an interdisciplinary and relevant curriculum will combine ethical and intellectual training, and give equal weight to the sciences, the humanities, and the arts.

GVHS will be an intentionally diverse community, reflecting the many racial, ethnic, and social groups which make up New York City. The school was planned to open with a ninth grade class of 45-60 students, then build to 90 students per grade level over the following three years for a total of 360 students.

As of July 1, 2008, David Liebmann, an experienced independent school administrator and teacher, was appointed head of school.  Prior to GVHS, he worked at Shady Side Academy (PA), The Westminster Schools (GA), and The Chewonki Maine Coast Semester (ME).  David Clarke was named academic dean.  He served on the faculty at Parker School (HI), Menlo School (CA), and Buckingham Browne & Nichols School (MA) where he was academic dean and college counselor.  Tia Biasi served as director of development, having previously worked at Grace Church School (NY).  Camilla Campbell was admissions associate and Woody Loverude was admissions assistant.

A founding board of trustees composed of Greenwich Village residents, parents, philanthropists, and other supporters governs the school and provides guidance and support.

As of 2009, the planned opening was put on indefinite hold, as expected private funding failed to materialize.

External links
“From a Joke, a School Is Born in the Village”, New York Times, September 18, 2008
“Parents ‘work hard and take a risk’ to form a high school”, The Villager, September 24, 2008
“New private high school find home in Soho on Vandam St.”, The Villager, November 21, 2008
"Opening of Greenwich Village High School Just Postponed, Not Canceled", "The Observer", February 10, 2009

Private high schools in Manhattan
Proposed buildings and structures in New York City
Greenwich Village